China Dolls are a famous pop music singing duo from  Thailand. The group is composed of Pailin "Hwa Hwa" Rattanasangsatian and Supachaya "Bell" Lattisophonkul.

Career 
The duo has released several albums since their formation in 1999 and performed at the Asia 2000 Music Festival. The China Dolls are known for their song "Muay nee kah" (I Am a China Girl), which was later translated to Mandarin as "单眼皮女生" (Girls with Single Eyelids). They perform songs in both Thai language and Mandarin, which sometimes confuses Thai fans, but this has made the group popular in Taiwan as well as with Mandarin-speaking fans in Malaysia, Singapore and China. After a few years without a new CD under China Dolls name. Hwa Hwa has looked for a new partner since Bell has been working with her Dance School. Hwa Hwa and new partner Dan Chun released a new album on the Warner Music Taiwan label in 2010.

As of 2013, Bell and Hwa Hwa rejoined together as China Dolls and attended the Grammy Happy Face-Tival Reunion Concert under their Thai Label, GMM Grammy.

Personal life 
On February 23, 2013, Bell was happily wed to her husband. Her co-stars from Ratree-Brazia attended the wedding along with Hwa Hwa as bridesmaids.

Members

Hwa Hwa 
Birth Name: Pailin Rattanasangsatian
Chinese Name: ; 
Birth Date: 
Languages: Thai, Chinese, English

Bell 
Birth Name: Supachaya Lattisophonkul
Chinese Name: ; 
Birth Date: 
Languages: Thai, Chinese, English

Discography

Studio albums

Thai studio albums

Chinese studio albums

Extended plays

Compilation albums

Remix albums

Special projects
 China Guan (January 2000) - a collaborative project with 
 Cheer (2001) - an agency-wide project featuring collaborative songs and remixes by the participating artists.
 Cover Girls (June 2003) - an album containing international (mostly English) cover songs by female artists under GMM Grammy.
 2005 Tiwa Hula Hula (June 2005) - another original album containing the same lineup as 2002 Rahtree.
 10th Anniversary of Grammy Gold (July 2005) - featured in the 1st project album performing a cover of รองูเข้าฝัน by then-labelmate Duangjan Suwanee.
 2007 Show Girls (November 2006) - an album containing Thai original and cover songs featuring the same lineup as 2002 Rahtree (excluding Hwa Hwa).
 Brazia (December 2009) - an album containing international cover songs, also featuring the same lineup as 2002 Rahtree (excluding Hwa Hwa and Katreeya)

Digital Single 
 Nihao Nihao (2021)

Awards
 Nominee "The Best Group Singer" of Golden Melody Award 12th, Taiwan (May 2001)
 Winning Award of "Top Ten Golden Melody (Dan yan pi nü sheng)" of Singapore Golden Melody Award (2001)
 Winning Award of "Top Ten Hits (Dan yan pi nü sheng)" of Chinese Music Award, Genting, Malaysia (2001.Nov)
 Winning Award of "Top Ten Hits (Bu yao ni de li wu)" of Chinese Music Award at Genting, Malaysia (2001.Nov)
 Winning Bronze Award of "The Best Group Singer" Golden Melody Award 1st, Malaysia (November 2001)
 Winning "The Best Group Singer", Vietnam (2001)
 Winning "The Best Group Singer" 2nd, Vietnam (2002)
 Winning Award of "Top Ten Hits" ( OH OH OH), Vietnam (2001)
 Winning Award of "Top Ten Hits" ( OH OH OH 2nd ), Vietnam (2002)
 Winning Award of "Top Ten Hits" ( KON NAH MAW), Vietnam (2002)
 Winning Award of "Top Ten Hits" ( TING NONG), Vietnam (2002)
 Nominee "The Best Group Singer" of Golden Melody Award 2nd, Malaysia (November 2002)
 Winning Award of "Best Group Singer" of Chinese music award, Malaysia
 Awards of "Best Youth" from Government of Thailand, Thailand (2004)
 Award for Fighting Drug Abuse, Thailand (2003, 2004)
 Award for Fighting Gambling, Thailand (2004)
 Award for Participating in Blood Donation, Thailand (2004)
 Virgin Hitz 40 Award—Kao Mai Ruk, Thailand (2004)
 No.3 The best group singer-vote on internet, Taiwan (2006)
 "Volunteer artist", Thailand (2015)

Filmography
 Fong Yun - Wind and Cloud (Serial idol drama), Taiwan (2002)
 The Games (TV Show), Thailand (October 2004)
 RU JING PA (TV Show) (March 2007)
 Pu Kong Jao Sa Neh (Comedy); Hwa Hwa Only (2007)

Other works

Magazines
YOU, Singapore
Đất mũi, Vietnam (2002)
I-weekly, Singapore
Naruhodo the Taiwan, Taiwan and Japan (2002.May)
Billboard 23 Nov 2002
Her World, Thailand (2004.Sep)
Seventeen, Thailand (2004.Oct)
"FHM", Singapore (Only Hwahwa China dolls)
"ZOO", Thailand (Only Hwahwa China dolls)
OK Magazine, Thailand (2007.Feb) Features Hwa Hwa and her dog Hermes only
..etc..

Advertising
 Coca-Cola, Thailand (2001)
 Hang Ten, Taiwan and East Asia (2001.Jun-Sep)
 Motorola T191, Thailand and Singapore (2002)

Other appearances
 Host of "Miracle Mars" Press conference, Interview with Vic F4, Big S, etc., Thailand (October 20, 2004)
 Garnier Event, Bangkok Thailand (October 2007)
 Judges for dance contest, Thailand (2015–present)

External links 
 China Dolls on Billboard magazine/Page40
 China Dolls' Facebook

References

Mandopop musical groups
Mandarin-language singers of Thailand
Thai people of Chinese descent
Thai pop music groups
Musical groups from Bangkok
Thai musical duos